This article describes the shipping services of the London and South Western Railway and the vessels employed.

The London and South Western Railway (LSWR) started out as the London and Southampton Railway in 1838, with the object of linking the port facilities at Southampton with the capital, as well as the other ordinary business of a railway.

With the network extended to Portsmouth and Weymouth, it also developed a shipping business to the Isle of Wight, to the Channel Islands and to France.

Lymington services
The LSWR reached Lymington in July 1858. The town's commercial activity was declining, but an independent ferry operator provided services from Lymington to the Isle of Wight. This became the Solent Sea Steam Packet Company. The railway line originally terminated at what is now Lymington Town station, but silting in the Lymington River made berthing there increasingly difficult, and the LSWR extended the line to the present Lymington Pier station on 19 September 1860.

The original Solent pre-dated the arrival of the railway at Lymington, having been built in 1841. In 1858, Red Lion (built 1856) was added to the SSPC fleet to handle additional traffic brought by the railway, and a second Solent replaced the first on 3 November 1863.

Mayflower joined the fleet on 6 July 1866 had been built in Newcastle; she was tastefully fitted and comfortable. As well as plying to Yarmouth, she made excursion runs to Bournemouth, but was disposed of after 1878.

A new paddle steamer, entered service on 9 May 1893; she cost £6,000, having been built at the Northam Iron Works, Southampton. She was 120 feet (37 m) long.

The second Solent was becoming life expired at the end of the century, and in December 1899 the LSWR ordered a new paddle steamer from Mordey, Carney and Co of Southampton; the purchase price was to be £8,300. The builders evidently encountered difficulties, and when she was delivered in January 1901 she was found not to be compliant with the contract. Acceptance was refused, and after negotiation, Mordey, Carney offered to build a compliant vessel for £9,000; this proposal was accepted. The third Solent was handed over on 14 October 1901, the previous (second) vessel of the same name being sold for scrap in June 1901 for £225.

The Mayflower was sold for scrap in June 1905, realising £50.

A combined tug and cargo boat named Carrier was purchased from J Power on 6 February 1906. A 36-ton twin screw vessel, she had a wide beam providing a large deck for carrying motor cars, as the route  was becoming a popular means of getting to the Island.

Fleet

An incomplete list of LSWR ships:

The company also operated a number of ships on the Isle of Wight service from Portsmouth to Ryde jointly with the London, Brighton and South Coast Railway.

London and South Western Railway